The 1937-38 French Rugby Union Championship was won by Vienne that beat the Montferrand in the final.

The tournament was played by 40 clubs divided in eight pools of five clubs.
At the second round were admitted the first two of each pool.

Context 

The 1937 International Championship was won by Ireland, the France was excluded.

France won the second FIRA Tournament in Paris.

Semifinals

Final

External links
 Compte rendu de la finale de 1937, sur lnr.fr

1937
France
Championship